Geier v. American Honda Motor Company, 529 U.S. 861 (2000), was a United States Supreme Court case in which the Court held that a federal automobile safety standard pre-empted a stricter state rule. The Court held that Alexis Geier, who suffered severe injuries in a 1987 Honda Accord, could not sue Honda for failing to install a driver-side airbag – a requirement under District of Columbia tort law but not Federal law – because Federal law pre-empted the District's rule.

Background
Alexis Geier suffered severe injuries in a 1987 Honda Accord that did not possess a driver's side airbag. Geier and her family sought damages under the District of Columbia tort law "claiming that American Honda Motor Company was negligent in not equipping the Accord with a driver's side airbag." The District Court ruled in favor of Honda finding that "Geier's claims were expressly pre-empted by the Act." and created a conflict because the safety features of the 1987 Honda Accord were in compliance with Federal Vehicle Safety Standard (FMVSS) 208, under the National Traffic and Motor Vehicle Safety Act of 1966. The United States Court of Appeals for the District of Columbia Circuit affirmed.

Decision of the Supreme Court
Justice Stephen G. Breyer delivered the Court's 5–4 decision, which held: "[Geier's] 'no airbag' lawsuit conflicts with the objectives of FMVSS 208 and is therefore pre-empted by the Act." The dissent challenged the majority's "unprecedented use of inferences from regulatory history and commentary as a basis for implied pre-emption."

See also
 Honda Motor Company v. Oberg
 List of United States Supreme Court cases, volume 529

References

Further reading
Suing the Tobacco and Lead Pigment Industries: Government Litigation as Public Health Prescription by Donald G. Gifford. Ann Arbor, University of Michigan Press, 2010.

External links
 

United States Supreme Court cases
United States Supreme Court cases of the Rehnquist Court
2000 in United States case law
Airbags
Honda
Product liability case law